An in-motion scale weighs products in a conveyor system. They can be used for rejecting under- and over- weight products. Other types send the weights to a computer for data analysis and statistics. They may also be known as dynamic scales, belt weighers, but most prominently as checkweighers.

Applications
In-motion scales come in numerous variations based on application. A simple version may have only one belt or chain, and use software for transmission-of-weight only. Some are used to sort product by weight. Through the use of an infeed bed, weigh bed, and outfeed bed, in motion scales or dynamic scales can be equipped with metal detectors, vision / camera systems and various types of rejection systems.

See also 
checkweigher.

References

Weighing instruments